Continental Automotive Systems (CAS), founded in 1906 by Alfred Teves, a division of the German Continental AG, was a brake and electronics supplier to the automotive industry, supplying systems, components, electronics, lithium-ion batteries and engineering services for vehicle safety, comfort and powertrain performance. Its sales top €4.6 billion.

It comprises two units:  
Continental Temic — focus is on auto electronics while 
Continental Teves — a developer and manufacturer of hydraulic and electronic brakes and safety systems, and of stability and chassis control systems and electronic air suspension systems.

It supplies lithium-ion batteries for the GM E-Flex System of Chevrolet Volt, from A123Systems. 

CAS's acquisition of the Automotive division of Motorola was completed in July 2006.  Continental acquired Siemens VDO from Siemens AG in 2007.

In 2019, Continental reorganized the powertrain division into a new entity Vitesco Technologies with intention to spin-off, expected to occur in September 2021.

Production
CAS consists of 44 plants, research centers and test tracks in 15 countries including ten joint ventures in Asia. 

Average daily production includes 45,000 electronic brake systems, 136,000 brake calipers, 163,000 wheel speed sensors, 27,000 airbag components and 72,000 body electronic modules. Continental Automotive Systems’ sales for the year 2004 were €5.0 billion.

References

Auto parts suppliers of Germany
Electric vehicle battery manufacturers
Continental AG

de:Continental AG#Fahrzeugsysteme